Calgary Bowness was a provincial electoral district in Alberta, Canada, mandated to return a single member to the Legislative Assembly of Alberta using the first past the post method of voting from 1959 to 1971.

Calgary Bowness History

Boundary history

1959 redistribution
The Alberta government decided to return to using the first past the post system of voting from Single Transferable Vote for the 1959 general election. The province redistributed the Calgary and Edmonton super riding's and standardized the voting system across the province into single member districts.

Calgary Bowness was one of the six electoral districts created from the Calgary super riding that year. The others were Calgary Glenmore, Calgary Centre, Calgary West, Calgary North, Calgary North East, Calgary South East.

The district was named after the community of Bowness, and during its time encompassed the Northwestern part of the city.

Electoral history
The district was first won easily by former Social Credit federal Member of Parliament Charles Johnston in 1959. He was re-elected for his second term in 1963 defeating future Calgary city Alderman Peter Petrasuk in a hotly contested race.

The last of the three elections held in the electoral district would see Len Werry pick up the district for the Progressive Conservatives in the 1967 election. Johnston went down to defeat by less than 400 votes. Johnston retired. He did not return to politics before his death in 1971.

In 1971 the Calgary Bowness electoral district was abolished and re-distributed between the Calgary-Bow and Calgary-Foothills electoral districts.

Election results

1959 general election

1963 general election

1967 general election

See also
List of Alberta provincial electoral districts

References

Further reading

External links
Elections Alberta
The Legislative Assembly of Alberta

Former provincial electoral districts of Alberta